Jiovany Javier Ramos Díaz (born 26 January 1997) is a Panamanian footballer who plays as defender.

International career
Ramos made his debut for the Panama national team in a 0-0 friendly tie with Nicaragua on 26 February 2020.

References

External links
 
 NFT Profile

1997 births
Living people
Sportspeople from Panama City
Panamanian footballers
Panama international footballers
Panama youth international footballers
Association football defenders
San Francisco F.C. players
Liga Panameña de Fútbol players